Teamwork is the concept of people working together cooperatively.

Teamwork may also refer to:
"Teamwork" (House), a season six episode of House
"Teamwork" (Power Rangers), the third episode of Mighty Morphin Power Rangers' first season
Teamwork (sculpture), a public artwork by Omri Amrany in Milwaukee, Wisconsin, US
Teamwork (software), a web-based wide-scoped project-and-groupware management tool developed by Open Lab
"Teamwork" (song), created for the musical production of Chitty Chitty Bang Bang
"Teamwork", a song on the LazyTown soundtrack
Teamwork.com, a web-based project-management tool